Euphaedra sinuosa is a butterfly in the family Nymphalidae. It is found in the Democratic Republic of the Congo.

Subspecies
Euphaedra sinuosa sinuosa (Democratic Republic of the Congo: north-east to Uele and northern Kivu)
Euphaedra sinuosa plagiaria Hecq, 1980 (Democratic Republic of the Congo: Tshopo)
Euphaedra sinuosa smitsi Hecq, 1991 (Democratic Republic of the Congo: Kasai)

References

Butterflies described in 1974
sinuosa
Endemic fauna of the Democratic Republic of the Congo
Butterflies of Africa